Dan Counce (born October 22, 1951, in St. Louis, Missouri) is a retired American soccer player and current professional soccer executive. He played six seasons in the North American Soccer League and six more in the Major Indoor Soccer League. He also earned five caps with the United States national team between 1974 and 1976.

Player

College
After playing at Rosary High School in St. Louis, Counce attended St. Louis University where he played on the men’s soccer team. He was a member of the 1970, 1972 and 1973 NCAA soccer championship teams. In 1973, he won the Hermann Trophy as the outstanding collegiate soccer player in North America. Counce also was selected the MVP of the 1973 ISAA Senior Soccer Bowl and the NCAA National Championship soccer Tournament.

National team
He earned his first cap with the U.S. national team in a September 8, 1974, loss to Mexico. In 1975, he played only one of the five national team games, a 7–0 loss to Poland in March. It was over a year and a half later before he was called up again, this time for a November 12, 1976, tie with Haiti. His last game with the national team came a month later when he came on for fellow St. Louis University alumnus Al Trost in a 3–0 loss to Canada.

Professional
Through the years, Counce established himself as a journeyman player in the NASL. After finishing his career at St. Louis, he joined the Boston Minutemen of the North American Soccer League (NASL). He bounced from team to team, six total, over the next six years, finishing his NASL career with eight games for the Toronto Blizzard in 1979.  By this time, however, he had already begun to move towards indoor soccer. In 1978, he signed with the Philadelphia Fever of Major Indoor Soccer League (MISL). The 1978–1979 MISL season was the first for both the team and the league. That year, the Fever went to the MISL championship series, losing to the New York Arrows, despite goals from Counce. Counce continued to play in the MISL, but moved to the St. Louis Steamers for the 1979–1980 season. That year, Counce was named the team's MVP. However, he moved again in the off season to the Baltimore Blast. He was the Blast's team MVP in the 1980–1981 season. Counce remained with the Blast through the end of the 1983–1984 season when he retired from playing professionally.

Soccer management
Counce has been active in managing professional soccer teams even before retiring from playing. He was either a General Manager or Assistant General Manager for the St. Louis Steamers in 1979–1980, the Baltimore Blast from 1986–1990 and the St. Louis Storm, also of MISL, from 1990–1991.

From 1987–1991, Counce served on the United States Soccer Federation Executive Committee and the MISL Board of Directors from 1986–1991.

On January 15, 1997, the Rapids hired Counce as the team’s General Manager after its first season in Major League Soccer.  In 2002, MLS named Counce the league’s Executive of the Year. However, just two years later, AEG sold the Rapids to Kroenke Sports and he resigned at the conclusion of his contract in January 2005.

References

External links
 Philadelphia Fever bio
 NASL/MISL stats

1951 births
Living people
American expatriate sportspeople in Canada
American expatriate soccer players
American soccer players
Baltimore Blast (1980–1992) players
Boston Minutemen players
California Surf players
Expatriate soccer players in Canada
Association football forwards
Hermann Trophy men's winners
Major Indoor Soccer League (1978–1992) players
North American Soccer League (1968–1984) players
NCAA Division I Men's Soccer Tournament Most Outstanding Player winners
Philadelphia Fever (MISL) players
Saint Louis University alumni
Saint Louis Billikens men's soccer players
San Jose Earthquakes (1974–1988) players
San Antonio Thunder players
Soccer players from St. Louis
St. Louis Steamers (original MISL) players
Team Hawaii players
Toronto Blizzard (1971–1984) players
United States men's international soccer players